Strammer Max (English: roughly "Strapping Max") is a traditional name applied to various sandwich dishes in German cuisine.

German dish
The original  is a slice of bread, sometimes fried in butter, covered with ham and fried egg. The ham may also be pan-fried; it is also possible to replace the ham with a slice of roast beef, in which case the dish is sometimes called . Cheese and tomato are sometimes used, but these are later additions to the original recipe.

Outside of the Berlin region, the term is also used for several other dishes. Regional variations of the term are not set in stone, and it is not always possible to tell in advance what dish will be served after ordering  in a restaurant.

Dutch uitsmijter
The uitsmijter most traditionally uses white bread and a Dutch cheese such as Gouda, in place of the Strammer Max's rye bread and Swiss cheese respectively.

References 

Heinz Küpper, Illustriertes Lexikon der deutschen Umgangssprache (Stuttgart 1982), Vol. 5
Wörterbuch der obersächsischen Mundarten (Leipzig 1994), Vol. 3

External links
Strammer Max entry in the Duden dictionary
A traditional recipe

Belgian cuisine
German cuisine
German sandwiches
Egg sandwiches
Dutch cuisine